Deh-e Ali (also Romanized as Deh-e ‘Alī and Deh ‘Alī) is a village in Ravar Rural District, in the Central District of Ravar County, Kerman Province, Iran. At the 2006 census, its population was 837, in 207 families.

References 

Populated places in Ravar County